Fish fur is a Russian-language ironic expression used to describe poor quality of coats and other clothes worn for warmth. In modern times, it is also used for fake fur, especially of poor quality. The term traces back to a Russian proverb "A poor man's fur coat is of fish fur.".

The expression has often been used to describe the uniform of the Soviet Army. In particular, elements of winter uniform (ushanka, collars, mittens) of ordinary soldiers and lower ranks were made of wool pile, which has been a popular cheap material for civilian clothing as well.

Aleksandr Solzhenitsyn in his Gulag Archipelago records the expression "Stalin's fur" in the meaning of no fur of any kind, in reference to the dress of Gulag inmates, supposedly derived in an analogy with "fish fur".

See also 
Fur-bearing trout

References

External links
Women in Russian History: From the Tenth to the Twentieth Century, by Natalia Pushkareva

Russian words and phrases
Russian clothing
Textiles